Arvada West High School, nicknamed A-West, is a public secondary school in Arvada, Colorado, United States. Opened in 1963, it is one of four high schools in Arvada. It is part of the Jefferson County School District.

History
Arvada West High School was contracted in 1961 and opened in 1963.

By the late 1990s, Arvada West was serving so many students it was on a split schedule. Ralston Valley High School, which opened in 2000, relieved the overcrowding.

Extracurricular activities
The school's athletic teams, known as the Arvada West Wildcats, compete in CHSAA class 5A in the Jefferson County League. Teams are fielded in interscholastic competition in baseball, basketball, cheerleading and poms, cross country, football, golf, gymnastics, soccer, softball, swimming and diving, tennis, and volleyball.

State championship titles held by the school include:
Baseball: 1994 (6A)
Cheerleading: 1993 (6A)
Girls' basketball: 1978 (AAA)
Boys' cross country: 1974 (I)
Football: 1972 (AAA), 1997 (5A)
Girls' soccer: 1987
Softball: 1993 (6A), 1994 (6A), 1995 (5A), 1996 (5A), 1999 (5A), 2000 (5A)
Boys' track and field: 1975 (AAA), 1994 (6A), 2014 (5A)
Girls' track and field: 1976 (AAA), 1977 (AAA)
Volleyball: 1977 (AAA)
Wrestling: 1988 (AAA), 1992 (6A), 2014 (5A), 2015 (5A)

Notable alumni

 Roy Halladay (1995) – MLB pitcher for the Toronto Blue Jays and Philadelphia Phillies
 Barry Kooser (1987) – artist, painter, animation filmmaker, CCO of Worker Studio
 Kevin McDougal (1995) – NFL player
 Jayne McHugh – member of the United States women's national volleyball team in the 1988 Summer Olympics
 Casey Malone (1995) – Olympic discus thrower
 Brad Pyatt – NFL player for the Indianapolis Colts in 2003–2006; CEO of the company MusclePharm
 John Roush – University of Oklahoma football player; drafted by the San Diego Chargers in the 1975 NFL Draft

References

External list
 

Educational institutions established in 1963
Public high schools in Colorado
Jefferson County Public Schools (Colorado)
Schools in Jefferson County, Colorado
1963 establishments in Colorado